The Alpi Cusiane (or Prealpi Cusiane) are a sub-range of the Pennine Alps located  in Piemonte (Italy).

Etymology 
Alpi Cusiane literally means Alps of Cusio; Cusio is the geographical and historical area surrounding Lake of Orta, nowadays part of the province of Verbano-Cusio-Ossola.

Geography 
Administratively the westernmost part of the range belongs to the province of Vercelli, the southern part to province of Novara and the eastern and central ones to province of Verbano-Cusio-Ossola.

Borders 
Borders of the Alpi Cusiane are (clockwise):
 Varallo Sesia, Mastallone creek, Tesslu pass, Strona creek, Gravellona Toce (north),
 Lago Maggiore (east),
 Po plain between Arona and Gattinara (south),
 Valsesia from Gattinara to Varallo Sesia (west).

SOIUSA classification 

According to SOIUSA (International Standardized Mountain Subdivision of the Alps) the mountain range is an Alpine supergroup classified in the following way:
 main part = Western Alps
 major sector = North-Western Alps
 section = Pennine Alps
 subsection = Southern Valsesia Alps
 supergroup =Alpi Cusiane
 code =  I/B-9.IV-B

Subdivision 
The Alpi Cusiane are divided into two Alpine groups, none of them further subdivided in subgroups (in brackets is reported their SOIUSA code):
 costiera Capio-Massa del Turlo ( I/B-9.IV-B.1)
 massiccio del Mottarone  ( I/B-9.IV-B.2)
These two groups are connected by a low saddle not faraway from Gozzano.

Geology 
From the geological point of view the Alpi Cusiane are considered part of the Prealpine zone, divided from the crystalline zone of the Alps by the Insubric line. This important geologic fault forms the border between the Adriatic plate and the European plate. Hills and mountains located south-east of the line, like the Alpi Cusiane, can be considered part of southern Apulian foreland.

Notable summits

Winter sports 
In the Alpi Cusiane is located the ski resort of Mottarone, with 21 km of downhill skiing slopes; it's connected with Stresa by a cableway.

References

Maps
 Italian official cartography (Istituto Geografico Militare - IGM); on-line version: www.pcn.minambiente.it
 I.G.C. (Istituto Geografico Centrale) - Carta dei sentieri e dei rifugi scala 1:50.000 n. 12 Laghi Maggiore d'Orta e di Varese

External links

 www.mottarone.it

Mountain ranges of Italy
Mountain ranges of Piedmont
Pennine Alps